Ideal is an unincorporated community in Carroll County, Illinois, United States. Ideal is located on Illinois Route 78 south of Mount Carroll.

References

Unincorporated communities in Carroll County, Illinois
Unincorporated communities in Illinois